Pipa Pattern ( 琵琶图 ) is a work for string orchestra and woodwinds,
composed by He Xuntian in 2001.

Summary
Pipa Pattern (2001) was written especially for string orchestra and woodwind and it shows the sincere pursuit from composer of one performing skill , which expresses the utterly simple rhythm with unitary performing skill from beginning to the end. This works also reveals the composer’s deep feeling to oriental culture.

Inspiration
Pipa Pattern was inspired from Xuntian He’s poem Satori (1999).

performance

Pipa Pattern
Dirigent: Juanjo Mena
Orchester: BBC Philharmonic Orchestra
25. October 2015 Shanghai, Concert Hall, Oriental Art Center

Pipa Pattern, He Xuntian Works Concert
Dirigent: James Judd
Orchester: Israel Symphony Orchestra
8. November 2014 Shanghai, Concert Hall, Oriental Art Center 
Israel Symphony Orchestra

References

External links
Pipa Pattern published by Schott Music International, Germany

Compositions by He Xuntian
Compositions for orchestra
2001 compositions